Protoryx is an extinct genus of goat-antelope. A new species, P. tuvaensis, was described by E. L. Dmitrieva and N. V. Serdyuk in 2011, from Russia.

References

Prehistoric bovids
Fossil taxa described in 1891
Prehistoric even-toed ungulate genera